Kolda Department is one of the 45 departments of Senegal, located in the Kolda Region in the centre of the country.

Administration 
The capital settlement of Kolda Department is Kolda.

The communes are: Kolda, Dabo, Salikégné and Saré Yoba Diéga

The rural districts (Communautés rurales) comprise:
Arrondissement of Dioulacolon:
 Guiro Yéro Bocar
 Dioulacolon
 Tankanto Escale
 Médina El Hadj
Arrondissement de Mampatim:
Dialambéré
Médina Chérif
Mampatim
Bagadadji
Coumbacara
Arrondissement de Saré Bidji:
Thiétty
Saré Bidji

History 

Bg

Geography

Physical Geology

Population 
As of December 2002, the population of Kolda Department was 279,849 inhabitants. As of 2005, the population was estimated to have grown to 306,591 people. The Kolda population essentially works on agriculture. Kolda is crossed by the Casamance river, which favourises the farmers activities.

Historic sites
 Kolda Prefecture

References

Departments of Senegal
Kolda Region